Singapore is a small settlement in Waterberg District Municipality, Limpopo province, South Africa.

References 

Populated places in the Waterberg District Municipality